[[File:Yomiuri Shimbun Osaka headquarters in 201909 002.jpg|thumb|right|The Yomiuri Shimbun'''s Osaka office]]
[[File:Yomiuriseibu.JPG|thumb|right|The Yomiuri Shimbuns Fukuoka office]]

The  is a  Japanese newspaper published in Tokyo, Osaka, Fukuoka, and other major Japanese cities. It is one of the five major newspapers in Japan; the other four are the Asahi Shimbun, the Chunichi Shimbun, the Mainichi Shimbun, and the Nihon Keizai Shimbun. It is headquartered in Otemachi, Chiyoda, Tokyo.

It is a newspaper that represents Tokyo and generally has a conservative orientation. It is one of Japan's leading newspapers, along with the Osaka-based liberal (Third way) Asahi Shimbun and the Nagoya-based social democratic Chunichi Shimbun.

It is published by regional bureaus, all of them subsidiaries of The Yomiuri Shimbun Holdings, Japan's largest media conglomerate by revenue and the second largest media conglomerate by size behind Sony,The Yomiuri Shimbun Holdings is the largest media conglomerate by revenue in Japan, while Sony is Japan's largest media conglomerate by worldwide media/entertainment revenue. which is privately held by law and wholly owned by present and former employees and members of the Matsutarō Shōriki family. The Holdings has been part-owned by the family since Matsutarō Shōriki's purchase of the newspaper in 1924 (currently owning a total of 45.26% stock); despite its control, the family is not involved in its executive operations.

Founded in 1874, the Yomiuri Shimbun is credited with having the largest newspaper circulation in the world as of 2019, having a morning circulation of 7.0 million as of June 2021. The paper is printed twice a day and in several different local editions.

Yomiuri Shimbun established the Yomiuri Prize in 1949. Its winners have included Yukio Mishima and Haruki Murakami.

History
The Yomiuri was launched in 1874 by the Nisshusha newspaper company as a small daily newspaper. Throughout the 1880s and 1890s the paper came to be known as a literary arts publication with its regular inclusion of work by writers such as Ozaki Kōyō.

In 1924, Shoriki Matsutaro took over management of the company. His innovations included improved news coverage, a full-page radio program guide, and the establishment of Japan's first professional baseball team, now known as the Yomiuri Giants. The emphasis of the paper shifted to broad news coverage aimed at readers in the Tokyo area. By 1941 it had the largest circulation of any daily newspaper in the Tokyo area. In 1942, under wartime conditions, it merged with the Hochi Shimbun and became known as the Yomiuri-Hochi.

The Yomiuri was the center of a labor scandal in 1945 and 1946. In October 1945, a postwar "democratization group" called for the removal of Shoriki Matsutaro, who had supported Imperial Japan's policies during World War II. When Shoriki responded by firing five of the leading members of this group, the writers and editors launched the first "production control" strike on 27 October 1945. This method of striking became an important union tactic in the coal, railroad, and other industries during the postwar period. Shoriki Matsutaro was arrested in December 1945 as a Class-A war criminal and sent to Sugamo Prison. The Yomiuri'''s employees continued to produce the paper without heeding executive orders until a police raid on June 21, 1946. The charges against Shoriki were dropped and he was released in 1948. According to research by Professor Tetsuo Arima of Waseda University on declassified documents stored at NARA, he agreed to work with the CIA as an informant.

In February 2009, the Yomiuri entered into a tie-up with The Wall Street Journal for editing, printing and distribution. Since March 2009 the major news headlines of the Journals Asian edition have been summarized in Japanese in the evening edition of the Yomiuri.

The Yomiuri features an advice column, Jinsei Annai.

The Yomiuri has a history of promoting nuclear power in Japan.  In May 2011, when Naoto Kan, then Prime Minister of Japan, asked the Chubu Electric Power Company to shut down several of its Hamaoka Nuclear Power Plants due to safety concerns, the Yomiuri called the request "abrupt" and a difficult situation for Chubu Electric's shareholders. It wrote that Kan "should seriously reflect on the way he made his request." It then followed up with an article wondering how dangerous Hamaoka really was and called Kan's request "a political judgment that went beyond technological worthiness." The next day damage to the pipes inside the condenser was discovered at one of the plants following a leak of seawater into the reactor.

In 2012, the paper reported that Nobutaka Tsutsui, the Minister for Agriculture, had divulged secret information to a Chinese enterprise. Tsutsui sued the Yomiuri Shimbun for libel and was awarded 3.3 million yen in damages in 2015, on the basis that the truth of the allegations could not be confirmed.

In November 2014, the newspaper apologized after using the phrase "sex slave" to refer to comfort women, following its criticism of the Asahi Shimbuns coverage of Japan's World War II comfort women system.

The Yomiuri newspaper said in an editorial in 2011 "No written material supporting the claim that government and military authorities were involved in the forcible and systematic recruitment of comfort women has been discovered", and that it regarded the Asian Women's Fund, set up to compensate for wartime abuses, as a failure based on a misunderstanding of history. The New York Times reported on similar statements previously, writing that "The nation's (Japan's) largest newspaper, Yomiuri Shimbun, applauded the revisions" regarding removing the word "forcibly" from referring to laborers brought to Japan in the prewar period and revising the comfort women controversy. Yomiuri editorials have also opposed the DPJ government and denounced denuclearization as "not a viable option".

Other publications and ventures
Yomiuri also publishes The Japan News (formerly called The Daily Yomiuri), one of Japan's largest English-language newspapers. It publishes the daily Hochi Shimbun, a sport-specific daily newspaper, as well as weekly and monthly magazines and books.

Yomiuri Shimbun Holdings owns the Chuokoron-Shinsha publishing company, which it acquired in 1999, and the Nippon Television network. It is a member of the Asia News Network. The paper is known as the de facto financial patron of the baseball team Yomiuri Giants. They also sponsor the Japan Fantasy Novel Award annually. It has been a sponsor of the FIFA Club World Cup every time it has been held in Japan since 2006.

Digital resources
In November 1999, the Yomiuri Shimbun released a CD-ROM titled "The Yomiuri Shimbun in the Meiji Era," which provided searchable archives of news articles and images from the period that have been digitalized from microfilm. This was the first time a newspaper made it possible to search digitalized images of newspaper pictures and articles as they appeared in print.

Subsequent CD-ROMs, "The Taishō Era", "The pre-war Showa Era I", and "The pre-war Showa era II" were completed eight years after the project was first conceived. "Postwar Recovery", the first part of a postwar Shōwa Era series that includes newspaper stories and images until 1960, is on the way.

The system of indexing each newspaper article and image makes the archives easier to search, and the CD-ROMs have been well received by users as a result. This digital resource is available in most major academic libraries in the United States.

Locations
Tokyo Head Office
1-7-1, Otemachi, Chiyoda, Tokyo, Japan
Osaka Head Office
5-9, Nozakicho, Kita-ku, Osaka, Japan
West Japan Head Office
1-16-5, Akasaka, Chūō-ku, Fukuoka, Japan

Yomiuri Group

 conglomerate comprises many entities, including:
Yomiuri Giants
Nippon TV
Yomiuri Telecasting Corporation
Chuokoron-Shinsha, Inc.
Yomiuriland, an amusement park
Yomiuri Advertising Agency (also known as "Yomiko", later sold to Hakuhodo)

In popular culture
 Jake Adelstein's 2009 memoir Tokyo Vice is based on his time as the first American crime reporter at Yomiuri Shimbun, and was also the basis for a mini-series of the same name airing on HBO Max in 2022.

See also

Media of Japan

Notes

References

Further reading

External links

 Yomiuri Shimbun Online (Japanese)
  The Japan News (English)
 Guinness World Record: Highest Daily Newspaper Circulation
 Yomiuri Advertising Agency (Japanese)

Daily newspapers published in Japan
Mass media companies based in Tokyo
Publications established in 1874
English-language newspapers published in Japan
Conservative media in Japan
Centre-right newspapers
Right-wing newspapers
1874 establishments in Japan
Newspaper companies of Japan